The UEFA European Under-18 Championship 1958 Final Tournament was held primarily in Luxembourg, but matches were also played in West Germany, Belgium and France.

Teams
The following teams entered the tournament:

Group stage

Group A

Group B

Group C

Group D

Semifinals

Third place match

Final

External links
Results by RSSSF

UEFA European Under-19 Championship
Under-18
UEFA European Under-18 Championship, 1958
Nat
UEFA European Under-18 Championship
UEFA European Under-18 Championship
Sport in Esch-sur-Alzette
UEFA European Under-18 Championship, 1958
Sports competitions in Luxembourg City